The Rationals were an American rock band from Ann Arbor, Michigan.

History
The Rationals formed in 1964 and first recorded a single for a local label, A2 Records, in 1965. After scoring a local hit with the tune "Gave My Love", they recorded a remake of Otis Redding's "Respect". This won them a contract for national distribution by Cameo/Parkway, and the single ended up reaching #92 on the Billboard Hot 100. The record didn't break everywhere in the U.S. at the same time, so it had a tough time making a decent showing on the national charts. Several further singles, including "I Need You" and "Hold On Baby", were successes in Michigan but didn't catch on nationally. Lead singer Scott Morgan was asked to join Blood, Sweat & Tears, but he declined the offer. The group's only full-length, a self-titled effort, arrived on Crewe Records at the beginning of 1970, and the group split up soon after; Morgan went on to play with several other Detroit-area groups over the next three decades, including Sonic's Rendezvous Band (with Fred Smith of MC5) and several of his own bands.

The lyrics of Iggy Pop's track "Get Up And Get Out" from his 1980 album "Soldier" are mostly lifted from the band's 1967 single "Leavin' Here," which was included on Goldenlane Records' 2009 compilation, "60s Garage Nuggets."

In 1995, John Sinclair released a live recording of a 1968 Rationals benefit concert entitled Temptation 'bout to Get Me. Sinclair also named his book Guitar Army after the Rationals song of the same name.

The band's version of The Kinks' "I Need You" was also featured on the compilation Nuggets: Original Artyfacts from the First Psychedelic Era, 1965–1968. 

The Big Beat record label released Think Rational!, a two-CD anthology of the mid-1960s phase of the Rationals’ career, in July 2009.

In 2010, The Rationals were voted into the Michigan Rock and Roll Legends online Hall of Fame.

Members
Steve Correll – lead guitar, vocals
Bill Figg – drums
Scott Morgan – guitar, vocals
Terry Trabandt – bass, vocals

Discography
Albums

The Rationals, 1970
Temptation 'bout to Get Me, 1995
Think Rational!, 2009
The Rationals (Deluxe Edition), 2018

Singles

References

External links
 Official Rationals website
 A Brief History of the Rationals
 The Rationals

Garage rock groups from Michigan
Musical groups established in 1964
Musical groups disestablished in 1970
1964 establishments in Michigan
1970 disestablishments in Michigan
Musicians from Ann Arbor, Michigan